Any Dream Will Do may refer to:

"Any Dream Will Do" (song), from the musical Joseph and the Amazing Technicolor Dreamcoat, written by Andrew Lloyd Webber and Tim Rice
Any Dream Will Do (TV series), BBC television series that searched for a new, unknown lead to play Joseph in a West End revival of the musical Joseph and the Amazing Technicolor Dreamcoat